The Hippopotamus Defence refers to various irregular chess openings in which Black moves a number of pawns to the sixth , often developing pieces to the seventh rank, and does not move any pawns to the fifth rank in the opening.

Evaluation

Chess master and author Fred Reinfeld once stated of it that "any expert player would dismiss Black's position as lost." Grandmaster Reuben Fine, one of the world's strongest players in the 1930s and 1940s, instructing his readers how to deal with such "Irregular Openings", wrote that "once a plus in development or center is set up, a well-conducted attack will decide."

Reinfeld, who died in 1964, might have been surprised to see Black employing the same system of development successfully in the 1966 world championship match. There, Boris Spassky employed the same set-up, dubbed the "Hippopotamus" by commentators, in the 12th and 16th match games against World Champion Tigran Petrosian. In both games Spassky developed his bishops to b7 and g7, and his knights to d7 and e7. (See diagrams.) Both games ended in draws. (See illustrative games below.)

In employing this system against Petrosian, Spassky was likely inspired by the Slovak International Master Maximilian Ujtelky, who had been experimenting with similar openings for several years. Ujtelky's game as Black against Spassky at Sochi 1964, in which he played the same setup Spassky later adopted against Petrosian, is given below. Ujtelky played even more provocatively in some other games, such as against the Soviet International Master Rashid Nezhmetdinov in the same tournament (see diagram at right). Nezhmetdinov sacrificed pawns on moves 26, 36, and 41, a knight on move 45, and a bishop on move 47 – and lost in 75 moves. Amatzai Avni, an Israeli FIDE Master and psychologist, has written of Ujtelky's play:
Basically, Ujtelky was provoking his opponents to the extreme and was waiting for them to have a nervous breakdown. Sometimes he was slaughtered, at other times his scheme paid dividends.

International Master Andrew Martin has written of the Hippopotamus, "The idea is that Black develops within his first three ranks at the beginning of the game. He will construct a solid, stable yet flexible position, wait to see what White is doing and react accordingly."

In his book on the Hippo Attack & Defence, Eric Briffoz wrote:"The Hippo somehow combines the benefits of the Owen defence (1… b6), together with the benefits of the Modern Defence (1…g6).  While the Owen focuses on mainly controlling the central white squares d5 and e4, the Modern seeks to control the black ones on e5 and d4… "

Grandmaster Tiger Hillarp Persson has written: [T]he Hippo lies low in the water. It looks almost ridiculously passive and many theoreticians consider the Hippo to be a peaceful, almost meek animal. But nothing could be further from the truth. On closer scrutiny the animal, the position, and the statistics look almost entirely different. The Hippo is a fierce animal; ready to crush anyone who gets too close. Vlastimil Hort, Igor Glek and Mihai Suba are among the grandmasters who have employed the Hippo, and Kiril Georgiev has used it as an anti-computer line. As alluded to above, IM Andrew Martin wrote a book, The Hippopotamus Rises: The Re-emergence of a Chess Opening, about that opening in 2005. See review here.

The term "Hippopotamus Defence" was also used by the English amateur J. C. Thompson to describe a system of his devising, where Black played c6, d6, e6, and f6; developed his knight, via h6, to f7; and did not necessarily fianchetto his bishops. As White, Thompson played the mirror-image of this. Thompson advocated this system in his 1957 book Hippopotamus Chess Opening. However, Martin writes that "frankly, his ideas have little value today".

Illustrative games
Spassky vs. Ujtelky, Sochi 1964 1.e4 g6 2.d4 Bg7 3.Nc3 a6 4.Nf3 d6 5.Bc4 e6 6.Bg5 Ne7 7.a4 h6 8.Be3 b6 9.0-0 Nd7 10.Re1 0-0 11.Qd2 Kh7 12.Rad1 Bb7 13.Qe2 Qc8 14.Bf4 Rd8 15.h4 Nf8 16.Bb3 f6 17.Nb1 e5 18.Bc1 Ne6 19.c3 Rf8 20.Na3 f5? 21.dxe5 dxe5 22.Nxe5! Bxe5 23.exf5 Rxf5 24.Bc2 Rh5?? 25.Qxh5 1–0
Petrosian vs. Spassky, World Championship 1966 (game 12) 1.Nf3 g6 2.c4 Bg7 3.d4 d6 4.Nc3 Nd7 5.e4 e6 6.Be2 b6 7.0-0 Bb7 8.Be3 Ne7 9.Qc2 h6 10.Rad1 0-0 11.d5 e5 12.Qc1 Kh7 13.g3 f5 14.exf5 Nxf5 15.Bd3 Bc8 16.Kg2 Nf6 17.Ne4 Nh5 18.Bd2 Bd7 19.Kh1 Ne7 20.Nh4 Bh3 21.Rg1 Bd7 22.Be3 Qe8 23.Rde1 Qf7 24.Qc2 Kh8 25.Nd2 Nf5 26.Nxf5 gxf5 27.g4 e4 28.gxh5 f4 29.Rxg7 Qxg7 30.Rg1 Qe5 31.Nf3 exd3 32.Nxe5 dxc2 33.Bd4 dxe5 34.Bxe5+ Kh7 35.Rg7+ Kh8 36.Rg6+ Kh7 37.Rg7+ Kh8 38.Rg6+ Kh7 39.Rg7+ ½–½

Petrosian vs. Spassky, World Championship 1966 (game 16) 1.d4 g6 2.e4 Bg7 3.Nf3 d6 4.Be2 e6 5.c3 Nd7 6.0-0 Ne7 7.Nbd2 b6 8.a4 a6 9.Re1 Bb7 10.Bd3 0-0 11.Nc4 Qe8 12.Bd2 f6 13.Qe2 Kh8 14.Kh1 Qf7 15.Ng1 e5 16.dxe5 fxe5 17.f3 Nc5 18.Ne3 Qe8 19.Bc2 a5 20.Nh3 Bc8 21.Nf2 Be6 22.Qd1 Qf7 23.Ra3 Bd7 24.Nd3 Nxd3 25.Bxd3 Bh6 26.Bc4 Qg7 27.Re2 Ng8 28.Bxg8 Rxg8 29.Nd5 Bxd2 30.Rxd2 Be6 31.b4 Qf7 32.Qe2 Ra7 33.Ra1 Rf8 34.b5 Raa8 35.Qe3 Rab8 36.Rf1 Qg7 37.Qd3 Rf7 38.Kg1 Rbf8 39.Ne3 g5 40.Rdf2 h5 41.c4 Qg6 42.Nd5 Rg8 43.Qe3 Kh7 44.Qd2 Rgg7 45.Qe3 Kg8 46.Rd2 Kh7 47.Rdf2 Rf8 48.Qd2 Rgf7 49.Qe3 ½–½
Barczay vs. Ivkov, Sousse Interzonal 1967 1. e4 g6 2. d4 Bg7 3. Nf3 d6 4. Bc4 a6 5. 0-0 e6 6. Bg5? Ne7 7. Qd2 h6 8. Be3 Nd7 9. Nc3 b6 10. Rfe1 Bb7 11. a4 Nf6 12. e5? Nfd5 13. Bf4 Nxc3 14. Qxc3? (14.bxc3) 0-0 15. exd6 cxd6 16. Qa3 Nf5 17. c3? (17.Rad1) Bxf3 18. gxf3 e5! 19. Bg3 h5 20. dxe5 dxe5 21. Kh1 Qg5 0–1

Raymond Keene and G. S. Botterill remark, "Such strength as the Hippopotamus has derives from the resilience of a cramped but not compromised position, and the dangers White will run of 'trying too hard' and being tempted into a rash advance." They cite this game as an example of that phenomenon.

Baburin vs. Miles, 4NCL, England 2000 1. d4 e6 2. c4 b6 An English Defense, but it soon transposes to a Hippopotamus. 3. a3 g6 4. Nc3 Bg7 5. e4 Ne7 6. Nf3 Bb7 7. Bd3 d6 8. 0-0 Nd7 9. Re1 h6 10. h3 a6 11. Be3 g5 12. Rc1 c5 13. d5 Ng6 14. Bc2 Qe7 15. Qd2 0-0 16. Rcd1 Nde5 17. Nxe5 Bxe5 18. Bd3 Qf6 19. Na4 Rab8 20. Nxb6 Bc8 21. Na4 If 21.Nxc8 Rxb2! 22 Qa5 Rxc8 23 Qxa6 Rcb8 followed by ...Nf4 and ...Bd4. 21... Bd7 22. Nc3 Rb3 23. Rb1 Rfb8 24. Nd1 exd5 25. cxd5 Nf4 26. Bxf4 gxf4 27. Bc2 Rxh3! 28. gxh3 Kh8 29. f3 Rg8+ 30. Kh1 Qh4 0–1 (Notes by John B. Henderson)

This was one of Miles' last games, and posthumously won him the "Game of the Season" award.

 World Champion Kasparov played the Hippo defence (with success) in 2011 as well against Nigel Short. 
[Site "Leuven"] [Date "2011.10.09"] [EventDate "2011.10.09"] [Round "2"] [Result "1/2-1/2"] [White "Nigel Short"] [Black "Garry Kasparov"] [ECO "B06"] 1.e4 g6 2.d4 Bg7 3.Nf3 d6 4.Bc4 e6 5.Bb3 Ne7 6.c3 b6 7.Be3 Bb7 8.Nbd2 Nd7 9.h3 h6 10.Qe2 a5 11.0-0 a4 12.Bc2 0-0 13.Nh2 a3 14.b3 c5 15.Rad1 cxd4 16.cxd4 Nc6 17.Ndf3 Nb4 18.Bb1 Ba6 19.Qd2 Bxf1 20.Rxf1 Nc6 21.Bxh6 Nf6 22.Rd1 e5 23.Bxg7 Kxg7 24.Nf1 Qe7 25.d5 Nd4 26.Nxd4 exd4 27.Qxd4 Qe5 28.Qxe5 dxe5 29.Ne3 b5 30.Bd3 Rab8 31.f3 Rfc8 32.b4 Ne8 33.Nc2 Rc3 34.Kf2 Rbc8 35.Ne3 Nd6 36.Ke2 Rf8 37.Kd2 Rc7 38.g4 Rh8 39.Rh1 g5 40.Rh2 Kf6 41.Rh1 Ke7 42.Nc2 f6 43.Rh2 Rcc8 44.Bf1 Ra8 45.Kc3 Rhc8+ 46.Kb3 Rab8 47.h4 gxh4 48.Rxh4 Rh8 49.Rxh8 Rxh8 50.Nxa3 Rh1 51.Bxb5 ½–½

See also
 Hedgehog defense
 List of chess openings

References

Further reading

 The Hippopotamus Rises: The Re-emergence of a Chess Opening, Andrew Martin, Batsford Chess, 2005.  
 Play the Hippo, by IM Andrew Martin
 Easy Guide to the Hippo Attack & Defence, Eric Briffoz, CreateSpace Independent Publishing Platform; 1 edition (July 26, 2017)

External links
 Starting out the Hippopotamus defence
 Unusual Opening: The Hippo part 1 and part 2 videos at YouTube

Chess openings